Wadi al Aqiq (valley of the brown gem) is a holding company started by Osama bin Laden during the period he was based in Sudan.

One of the allegations Guantanamo captive Abu Sufian Ibrahim Ahmed Hamuda Bin Qumu
faced during his second annual Administrative Review Board hearing was that he worked as a driver for Wadi al Aqiq.

References

Osama bin Laden
Companies of Sudan